Vincenzo Garioni (19 November 1856 – 24 April 1929) was an Italian general. He was the governor of Tripolitania (1913-1914), and later had become the governor of both of Tripolitania and Cyrenaica.

After being promoted to colonel in 1900, he commanded of the Italian Expeditionary Corps in China sent to put down the Boxer Rebellion. Then, as a lieutenant-general in Italo-Turkish war (1911-1912), he (with Luigi Agliardi, another China veteran) was assigned with the conquest of Zuwara, Ghadames on the Libyan-Tunisian border.    

Between his two terms as a governor, he commanded, at the Beginning of World War I, VII Corps, and temporarily the 3rd Italian Army until arrival of Duke of Aosta.

During the sixth battle of the Isonzo (August 1916), he commanded II corps of the 2nd Italian Army.

Notes

1856 births
1929 deaths
People from Montebelluna
Italian colonial governors and administrators
Italian military personnel of the Italo-Turkish War
Italian military personnel of World War I
Italian military personnel of the Boxer Rebellion